Breath of Life is a 1990 Italian drama film directed by Beppe Cino. It is an adaptation of Gesualdo Bufalino's 1981 novel, Diceria dell'untore. The film, starring Franco Nero and Vanessa Redgrave was released in Italy on 11 October 1990.

Plot
In 1946, Gesualdo (Nero) is a recovering Second World War soldier in a Palermo TB clinic. Most of the patients are young yet are aware of their impending death. Gesualdo holds the same bleak expectations. Yet miraculously he recovers while all the others perish, including the medical professionals. Gesualdo is the only survivor that can bear witness to the ordeal in the clinic.

Cast
Franco Nero as Gesualdo
Vanessa Redgrave as Sister Crucifix
Fernando Rey as Doctor
Salvatore Cascio
Tiberio Murgia
Toni Ucci
Lucrezia Lante della Rovere as Marta
Remo Girone as Sebastiano
Gianluca Favilla
Dalila Di Lazzaro
Ferdinando Murolo

References

External links
 

1990 films
Italian drama films
1990 drama films
1990s Italian-language films
English-language Italian films
1990s English-language films
Films shot in Italy
Films based on Italian novels
Films set in Sicily
Films set in hospitals
Films scored by Carlo Siliotto
1990 multilingual films
Italian multilingual films
1990s Italian films